The non-marine mollusks of China are a part of the molluscan fauna of China (wildlife of China). A number of species of non-marine mollusks are found in the wild in China.

Freshwater gastropods

Amnicolidae
 Erhaia chinensis (Liu & Zhang, 1979)
 Erhaia daliensis Davis & Kuo in Davis et al., 1985
 Erhaia gongjianguoi (Kang, 1983)
 Erhaia hubeiensis (Liu, Zhang & Wang, 1983)
 Erhaia jianouensis (Liu & Zhang, 1979)
 Erhaia kunmingensis Davis & Kuo in Davis et al., 1985
 Erhaia lii (Kang, 1985)
 Erhaia liui (Kang, 1985)
 Erhaia robusta (Kang, 1986)
 Erhaia shimenensis (Liu, Zhang & Chen, 1982)
 Erhaia tangi (Cheng, Wu, Li & Lin, 2007)
 Erhaia triodonta (Liu, Wang & Zhang, 1991)
 Erhaia wantanensis (Kang, 1983)
 Erhaia wufungensis (Kang, 1983)

Viviparidae
 genus Margarya with 11 species is endemic to Yunnan Province

Pomatiopsidae
 Fenouilia kreitneri Neumayr, 1880 - endemic
 Lacunopsis auris Y.-Y. Liu, Y.-X. Wang & W.-Z. Zhang, 1980
 Lacunopsis yunnanensis Y.-Y. Liu, Y.-X. Wang & W.-Z. Zhang, 1980
 Lacunopsis yuxiensis Shi, Shu, Qiang, Xu, Tian & Chang, 2020
 Oncomelania hupensis Gredler, 1881
 Tricula hortensis Attwood & Brown, 2003

Pachychilidae
 Brotia yunnanensis Köhler, Du & Yang, 2010

Thiaridae
 Melanoides tuberculata (O. F. Müller, 1774)

Land gastropods

Cyclophoridae
 Cyclophorus aquilus (Sowerby, 1843)
 Cyclophorus clouthianus Möllendorff, 1882
 Cyclophorus dilatatus Heude, 1886
 Cyclophorus dodrans dodrans Mabille, 1887
 Cyclophorus fargesianus Heude, 1885
 Cyclophorus martensianus Möllendorff, 1874
 Cyclophorus pyrostoma Möllendorff, 1882
 Cyclophorus volvulus (O.F. Müller, 1774)
 Cyclophorus zebrinus (Benson, 1836)
 Scabrina fimbriosa (Möllendorff, 1885)
 Scabrina hirsuta (Möllendorff, 1884)
 Scabrina laciniata (Heude, 1885)
 Scabrina moellendorffi (Preston, 1909)

Alycaeidae
 Pincerna costulosa (Bavay & Dautzenberg, 1912)
 Pincerna maolanensis Luo, Zhang & Zhuo, 2009
 Pincerna vallis Chen & Wu, 2020

Diplommatinidae
 Arinia cathaicola Pilsbry, 1934
 Sinoarinia feii Chen, 2020
 Sinoarinia maolanensis (Zhang, Chen & Zhuo, 2013)
 Sinoarinia mirifica (Li, Zhuo & Luo, 2005)

Enidae
 Pupopsis dissociabilis Sturany, 1900
 Pupopsis hendan Wu & Gao, 2010
 Pupopsis maoxian Wu & Gao, 2010
 Pupopsis paraplesia Sturany, 1900 
 Pupopsis polystrepta Sturany, 1900
 Pupopsis pupopsis Gredler, 1898
 Pupopsis retrodens (Martens, 1879)
 Pupopsis rhodostoma Wu & Gao, 2010
 Pupopsis subpupopsis Wu & Gao, 2010
 Pupopsis subtorquilla Wu & Gao, 2010
 Pupopsis torquilla (Möllendorff, 1901)
 Pupopsis yengiawat Wu & Gao, 2010
 Pupopsis yuxu Wu & Gao, 2010
 Pupopsis zilchi Wu & Gao, 2010
 Subzebrinus labiellus (Martens, 1881)

Strobilopsidae
 Eostrobilops diodontina (Heude, 1885)
 Eostrobilops humicolus Páll-Gergely et Hunyadi, 2015
 Eostrobilops zijinshanicus Chen, 2019

Clausiliidae
 Acanthophaedusa reductans Grego & Szekeres, 2011
 Bacillophaedusa annularis Grego & Szekeres, 2011
 Bathyptychia (Bathyptychia) beresowskii flavida Nordsieck, 2005
 Bathyptychia (Bathyptychia) martensi Nordsieck, 2001
 Bathyptychia (Bathyptychia) zechuani Grego & Szekeres, 2020
 Cirrophaedusa plicilabris Grego & Szekeres, 2011
 Dautzenbergiella (Dautzenbergiella) chinensis Nordsieck, 2007
 Dautzenbergiella (Dautzenbergiella) leekremeri Grego & Szekeres, 2020
 Dautzenbergiella (Mansuyiella) mansuyi ootanii Nordsieck, 2007
 Dautzenbergiella (Mansuyiella) paulae Grego & Szekeres, 2017
 Dautzenbergiella (Dautzenbergiella) yanghaoi Grego & Szekeres, 2020
 Distortiphaedusa imprimata Grego & Szekeres, 2011
 Euphaedusa costifera Nordsieck, 2001
 Euphaedusa gemina davidi Nordsieck, 2001
 Euphaedusa (Telophaedusa) ishibei Nordsieck, 2007
 Euphaedusa krejcii Nordsieck, 2001
 Euphaedusa (Papilliphaedusa) yongshuae Nordsieck, 2007
 Euphaedusa yunnancola Nordsieck, 2001
 Falsiluna harryleei Grego & Szekeres, 2011
 Formosana abscedens Hunyadi et Szekeres, 2016
 Formosana kremeri Grego & Szekeres, 2017
 Formosana renzhigangi Grego & Szekeres, 2019
 Formosana schawalleri Nordsieck, 2001
 Formosana seguiniana (Heude, 1885)
 Fuchsiana zhangqingae Grego & Szekeres, 2017
 Grandinenia maroskoi Grego & Szekeres, 2011
 Grandinenia ookuboi pulchricosta Nordsieck, 2007
 Grandinenia rex Nordsieck, 2007
 Grandinenia takagii gigas Nordsieck, 2007
 Hemiphaedusa (Synprosphyma) ehrmanni Nordsieck, 2001
 Hemiphaedusa (Margaritiphaedusa) macroptychia Nordsieck, 2007
 Hemiphaedusa (Notoptychia) media Nordsieck, 2005
 Hemiphaedusa (Selenophaedusa) ooharai Nordsieck, 2007
 Hemiphaedusa (Hemiphaedusa) pluviatilis zilchi Nordsieck, 2001
 Hemiphaedusa (Notoptychia) polydonella Nordsieck, 2005
 Hemiphaedusa (Margaritiphaedusa) protrita hunancola Nordsieck, 2001
 Hemiphaedusa (Synprosphyma) pseudinversa Nordsieck, 2001
 Hemiphaedusa (Margaritiphaedusa) rusticana amoena Nordsieck, 2001
 Hemiphaedusa (Dendrophaedusa) spinifera Nordsieck, 2005
 Macrophaedusella jesuitica Nordsieck, 2001
 Margaritiphaedusa hunyadii Grego & Szekeres, 2017
 Margaritiphaedusa whitteni kremerorum Grego & Szekeres, 2017
 Miraphaedusa takagii Nordsieck, 2005
 Oospira (Siphonophaedusa) grangeri asiphonia Nordsieck, 2007
 Oospira (Formosana) kongshanensis Nordsieck, 2007
 Oospira (Formosana) moschinella Nordsieck, 2007
 Oospira (Formosana) ooharai Nordsieck, 2007
 Oospira (Atractophaedusa) ookuboi Nordsieck, 2005
 Oospira (Formosana) schwalleri Nordsieck, 2001
 Oospira (Formosana) splendens Nordsieck, 2005
 Oospira (Atractophaedusa) takagii Nordsieck, 2005
 Oospira (Formosana) umbrosa Nordsieck, 2007
 Oospira yanghaoi Grego & Szekeres, 2017
 Oospira (Atractophaedusa) zhaoyifani Grego & Szekeres, 2008
 Papilliphaedusa kunmingensis (Chen et Zhang, 1999)
 Phaedusa (Phaedusa) boettgeri Nordsieck, 2001
 Phaedusa (Phaedusa) lypra latestriata Nordsieck, 2007
 Phaedusa (Metaphaedusa) matejkoi Grego & Szekeres, 2011
 Phaedusa (Metaphaedusa) pallidocincta ookuboi Nordsieck, 2005
 Phaedusa (Phaedusa) potanini pretiosa Nordsieck, 2001
 Phaedusa (Metaphaedusa) pseudaculus Nordsieck, 2001
 Probosciphaedusa mulini Chen & Ouyang, 2021
 Selenophaedusa diplochilus griffithsi Grego & Szekeres, 2011
 Selenophaedusa jimenezi Grego & Szekeres, 2017
 Serriphaedusa boissieaui Grego & Szekeres, 2011
 Serriphaedusa (Gibbophaedusa) gerberi Grego & Szekeres, 2019
 Serriphaedusa ookuboi Nordsieck, 2007
 Serriphaedusa (Gibbophaedusa) poppei Grego & Szekeres, 2017
 Serriphaedusa (Serriphaedusa) tenuispira Grego & Szekeres, 2020
 Serriphaedusa (Altiplica) yanghaoi Grego & Szekeres, 2017
 Serriphaedusa (Gibbophaedusa) zhangqingae Grego & Szekeres, 2020
 Synprosphyma ambigua Grego & Szekeres, 2017
 Synprosphyma (Synprosphyma) basilissa planicollis Nordsieck, 2007
 Synprosphyma segersi Grego & Szekeres, 2017
 Synprosphyma yanghaoi Grego & Szekeres, 2011
 Synprosphyma yunlingi Grego & Szekeres, 2020
 Tropidauchenia (Grandinenia) capreolus Nordsieck, 2005
 Tropidauchenia (Grandinenia) costigera Nordsieck, 2005
 Tropidauchenia danjuan Qiu, 2021
 Tropidauchenia (Grandinenia) fuchsi amabilis Nordsieck, 2005
 Tropidauchenia (Grandinenia) gastrum Nordsieck, 2005
 Tropidauchenia (Grandinenia) gastrum densecostulata Nordsieck, 2005
 Tropidauchenia (Grandinenia) gastrum laticosta Nordsieck, 2005
 Tropidauchenia (Tropidauchenia) hitomiae Nordsieck, 2007
 Tropidauchenia (Tropidauchenia) hitomiae rufescens Nordsieck, 2007
 Tropidauchenia (Tropidauchenia) lucida Nordsieck, 2007
 Tropidauchenia (Tropidauchenia) lucida gracillima Nordsieck, 2007
 Tropidauchenia (Tropidauchenia) nakaharai Nordsieck, 2007
 Tropidauchenia (Tropidauchenia) napoensis Nordsieck, 2007
 Tropidauchenia (Grandinenia) ookuboi Nordsieck, 2005
 Tropidauchenia (Tropidauchenia) ootanii Nordsieck, 2007
 Tropidauchenia (Tropidauchenia) orientalis rufocincta Nordsieck, 2007
 Tropidauchenia parasulcicollis Qiu, 2021
 Tropidauchenia (Grandinenia) pseudofuchsi Nordsieck, 2005
 Tropidauchenia sulcicollis Grego & Szekeres, 2017
 Tropidauchenia (Grandinenia) takagii rubens Nordsieck, 2005
 Tropidauchenia yanghaoi Grego & Szekeres, 2017

Arionidae
 Arion subfuscus (Draparnaud, 1805)

Philomycidae
 Meghimatium bilineatum (Benson, 1842)
 Meghimatium cf. pictum (Stoliczka, 1873)
 Meghimatium rugosum (Chen & Gao, 1982)

Anadenidae
 Anadenus dautzenbergi Collinge, 1900 - nomen dubium
 Anadenus parvipenis Wiktor, De-niu & Wu, 2000
 Anadenus sechuenensis Collinge, 1899
 Anadenus sinensis Möllendorff, 1899 - nomen dubium
 Anadenus yangtzeensis Wiktor, De-niu & Wu, 2000
 Anadenus yunnanensis Wiktor, De-niu & Wu, 2000
 Anadenus gonggashanensis Wiktor, De-niu & Wu, 2000

Limacidae
 Lehmannia valentiana (Férussac, 1823)
 Limax flavus Linnaeus, 1758

Agriolimacidae
 Deroceras altaicum (Simroth, 1886)
 Deroceras laeve (O.F. Müller, 1774)

Hypselostomatidae
 Angustopila dominikae Páll-Gergely & Hunyadi, 2015
 Angustopila fabella Páll-Gergely & Hunyadi, 2015
 Angustopila huoyani Jochum, Slapnik & Páll-Gergely, 2014
 Angustopila subelevata Páll-Gergely & Hunyadi, 2015
 Angustopila szekeresi Páll-Gergely & Hunyadi, 2015
 Hypselostoma lacrima Páll-Gergely & Hunyadi, 2015
 Hypselostoma socialis Páll-Gergely & Hunyadi, 2015
 Krobylos sinensis Páll-Gergely & Hunyadi, 2015

Bradybaenidae
 “Pupopsis” soleniscus (Möllendorff, 1901)
 genus Stilpnodiscus - endemic to China

Diapheridae
 Sinoennea Kobelt, 1904
 Sinoennea guiyangensis T.-C. Luo, D.-N. Chen & G.-Q. Zhang, 1998
 Sinoennea manyunensis B. Fan, M. Tian & Y.-X. Chen, 2014
 Sinoennea maolanensis T.-C. Luo, W.-C. Zhou & D.-N. Chen, 2004

Plectopylidae
 Sicradiscus mansuyi (Gude, 1908)

Freshwater bivalves

Sphaeriidae
 Pisidium stewarti Preston, 1909

Corbiculidae
 Corbicula fluminea (O. F. Müller, 1774) Found throughout eastern Asia, now an invasive species in waterways throughout Europe, Australia, and the Americas.

See also
 Environment of China
 Conservation in China
 List of marine molluscs of China

Lists of molluscs of surrounding countries:
 List of non-marine molluscs of North Korea
 List of non-marine molluscs of South Korea
 List of non-marine molluscs of Russia
 List of non-marine molluscs of Mongolia
 List of non-marine molluscs of Kazakhstan
 List of non-marine molluscs of Kyrgyzstan
 List of non-marine molluscs of Tajikistan
 List of non-marine molluscs of Afghanistan
 List of non-marine molluscs of Pakistan
 List of non-marine molluscs of India
 List of non-marine molluscs of Nepal
 List of non-marine molluscs of Bhutan
 List of non-marine molluscs of Burma
 List of non-marine molluscs of Vietnam
 List of non-marine molluscs of Hong Kong
 List of non-marine molluscs of the Philippines
 List of non-marine molluscs of Taiwan
 List of non-marine molluscs of Japan

References

Further reading
  Bachmann O. & Gredler V. (1894). "Zur Conchylienfauna von China. XVIII. Stück.". Annalen des k. k. Naturhistorischen Hofmuseums 9: 415–429.
 Cui Y. D., Liu X. Q. & Wang H. Z. (2008). "Macrozoobenthic community of Fuxian Lake, the deepest lake of southwest China". Limnologica-Ecology and Management of Inland Waters 38(2): 116-125. .
 Davis G. M., Guo Y. H., Chen P. L., Yang H. M. & Chen D. J. (1989). "Notes on the Anatomy of a Small Hubendickia (Gastropoda: Pomatiopsidae: Triculinae) from Yunnan, China". Proceedings of the Academy of Natural Sciences of Philadelphia 141: 321-331. JSTOR.
    Gredler V. (1887). "Zur Conchylienfauna von China". Annalen des k. k. Naturhistorischen Hofmuseums 2: 283–292. 4 Tables.
   Heude P. M. (1875–1885). Conchyliologie fluviatile de la province de Nanking et de la Chine centrale. Paris. 10 volumes. another scan - this whole work is about freshwater bivalves of China
   Heude P. M. (1882–1890). Mémoires concernant l'histoire naturelle de l'empire chinois par des pères de la Compagnie de Jésus. Notes sur les Mollusques terrestres de la vallée du Fleuve Bleu. Mision Catholique, Chang-Hai.
 (1882). 2: 1-88, plates 12-21.
 (1885). 3: 89-132, plates 22-32.
 (1890). 4: 125[sic]-188, plates 33-43.
 Nordsieck H. (2001). "Revision of the system of the Phaedusinae from mainland China with the description of new taxa (Gastropoda: Stylommatophora: Clausiliidae)". Archiv für Molluskenkunde 129: 25-63.
 Nordsieck H. (2005). "New taxa of Phaedusinae and Garnieriinae from mainland China and Taiwan (Gastropoda: Stylommatophora: Clausiliidae)". Archiv für Molluskenkunde 134: 23-52. .
 Nordsieck H. (2007). "New taxa of Phaedusinae and Garnieriinae from southern China (Gastropoda: Stylommatophora: Clausiliidae)". Archiv für Molluskenkunde 136(2): 217-243, 5 pls. .
  Chen Yuanxiao (2016). 云南陆生贝类 Terrestrial Molluscs in Yunnan. 276 pp. .

Molluscs
China
China